Castle Hill is a census-designated place in Contra Costa County, California. The 2010 United States census reported Castle Hill's population was 1,299.

Geography
According to the United States Census Bureau, the CDP has a total area of 0.728 square miles (1.855 km), all of it land.

Demographics

At the 2010 census Castle Hill had a population of 1,299. The racial makeup of Castle Hill was 1,112 (85.6%) White, 29 (2.2%) African American, 1 (0.1%) Native American, 110 (8.5%) Asian, 2 (0.2%) Pacific Islander, 9 (0.7%) from other races, and 36 (2.8%) from two or more races. Hispanic or Latino of any race were 78 people (6.0%).

The census reported that 1,265 people (97.4% of the population) lived in households, 12 (0.9%) lived in non-institutionalized group quarters, and 22 (1.7%) were institutionalized.

There were 497 households, 147 (29.6%) had children under the age of 18 living in them, 322 (64.8%) were opposite-sex married couples living together, 32 (6.4%) had a female householder with no husband present, 15 (3.0%) had a male householder with no wife present.  There were 19 (3.8%) unmarried opposite-sex partnerships, and 10 (2.0%) same-sex married couples or partnerships. 99 households (19.9%) were one person and 52 (10.5%) had someone living alone who was 65 or older. The average household size was 2.55.  There were 369 families (74.2% of households); the average family size was 2.93.

The age distribution was 275 people (21.2%) under the age of 18, 62 people (4.8%) aged 18 to 24, 203 people (15.6%) aged 25 to 44, 472 people (36.3%) aged 45 to 64, and 287 people (22.1%) who were 65 or older.  The median age was 50.3 years. For every 100 females, there were 97.7 males.  For every 100 females age 18 and over, there were 93.9 males.

There were 523 housing units at an average density of ,of which 497 were occupied, 441 (88.7%) by the owners and 56 (11.3%) by renters.  The homeowner vacancy rate was 1.6%; the rental vacancy rate was 8.2%.  1,137 people (87.5% of the population) lived in owner-occupied housing units and 128 people (9.9%) lived in rental housing units.

Education
Castle Hill is in the Walnut Creek Elementary School District and the Acalanes Union High School District.

References

Census-designated places in Contra Costa County, California
Census-designated places in California